András Cser is a Hungarian linguist and Professor of Theoretical Linguistics at Pázmány Péter Catholic University. He is the editor-in-chief of Acta Linguistica Academica.
Cser is known for his works on phonology.

Books
The Phonology of Classical Latin, Wiley-Blackwell 2020. ISBN 978-1119700609 
 The Typology and Modelling of Obstruent Lenition and Fortition Processes. Budapest: Akadémiai Kiadó, 2003. ISBN 9630580365.

References

External links
András Cser
 Basic Types of Phonological Change
His data sheet in the Hungarian Scientific Bibliography
His data sheet at the Hungarian Doctoral Council

Living people
Linguistics journal editors
Academic staff of Pázmány Péter Catholic University
Linguists from Hungary
Phonologists
Latinists
Eötvös Loránd University alumni
Pázmány Péter Catholic University alumni
Morphologists
Historical linguists
Year of birth missing (living people)